Momin Saqib is a Pakistani television social media sensation and actor. He rose to prominence with his viral video and gained on-screen mass media prominence with the portrayal of Essa Qudratullah in Hum TV's Raqs-e-Bismil, for which he received Hum Award for Best Television Sensation Male and a nomination of Best Emerging Talent at 21st Lux Style Awards.

Career

Television and film career 

In 2020, he made his acting debut with Hum TV's Be Adab which was directed by Shahzad Kashmiri. He portrayed the role of a devoted son of the characters played by Sania Saeed and Rehan Sheikh. He then appeared in Hashim Nadeem's scripted Raqs-e-Bismil alongside Imran Ashraf, Sarah Khan, Anoushey Abbasi and Mehmood Aslam. He received praise for portraying an emotionally intense yet introvert character and a nomination of Best Emerging Talent in TV at 21st Lux Style Awards.

In 2022, he made his cinematic debut with Ehteshamuddin's Dum Mastam alongside Imran Ashraf and Amar Khan.

Off-screen work 
In June 2020, he along with Malala Yousafzai join hands with Oxford for academic access and pulbic diplomacy for the students.

Filmography

Television

Awards and accolades

References 

Living people
Year of birth missing (living people)